Idiots Behind the Wheel is the debut studio album by English electronic music producer Ils. It was released by Fuel Records on 9 August 1999 on CD and vinyl.

Track listing

CD
 "Lights" 4:03
 "Revolver" 6:13
 "Sabotage" 5:36
 "About That Time" 6:26
 "8 Ace" 4:59
 "Greyhound" 6:32
 "Strange Light" 6:29
 "A Word from the President" 1:44
 "Full Tilt" 2:01
 "Edge Note" 4:53
 "No 84" 5:29
 "Flame Out" 3:29

Vinyl

 "Lights" 4:03
 "Revolver" 6:13
 "Greyhound" 6:32
 "Sabotage" 5:36
 "No 84" 5:29
 "About That Time" 6:26
 "Full Tilt" 2:01
 "Strange Light" 6:29
 "Edge Note" 4:53

References

1999 debut albums
Ils (producer) albums